Thorne Forrester is a fictional character on CBS soap opera The Bold and the Beautiful. The character was played by Clayton Norcross from the show's premiere in 1987 until 1989, by Jeff Trachta from 1989 until 1996 and Winsor Harmon from 1996 to 2016. In September 2017, Harmon announced that the role of Thorne was to be recast, and several days after, it was announced that daytime veteran Ingo Rademacher had been cast in the role; he made his first appearance on November 27, 2017. Rademacher departed the role in February 2019. Harmon briefly returned to the role in March 2022.

Character creation and casting
Actor Clayton Norcross debuted in the role of Thorne in the serial's premiere episode on March 23, 1987. He remained in the role until 1989, when he was recast with Jeff Trachta. In 1996, Trachta was let go from the role and was recast with former All My Children actor Winsor Harmon. In May 2010, it was announced that Harmon had been downgraded to a recurring capacity, following a "mutual decision" between Harmon and the higher ups at The Bold and the Beautiful. On September 23, 2017, Harmon announced that executive producer Bradley Bell intended to recast the role of Thorne. Two days later, TV Insider's Michael Logan announced that former General Hospital actor Ingo Rademacher had been cast in the role of Thorne; he made his first appearance on November 27, 2017. On his exit, Harmon stated: "It shocked me, especially since [Executive Producer Brad Bell] had called said, 'I want you to come to the fan club event [in August].' I was told there was a storyline coming and then [a month later], I got the call from him that he was going to recast the role. So yeah, it was a bit of a shocker, I have to say." On December 22, 2018, Rademacher announced he had opted to not extend his deal and announced his imminent exit from the role.

Storylines

Thorne Forrester is the younger – and only biological – son of Eric and Stephanie Forrester. Thorne was raised in Beverly Hills with his siblings, Ridge, Kristen, and Felicia Forrester. Thorne grew up in the shadow of big brother Ridge. Thorne had a crush on Ridge's fiancée Caroline Spencer. When Caroline dumped Ridge for having a one-night stand before their wedding, Thorne befriended Caroline, and the friendship turned to romance. But Thorne knew Caroline still loved Ridge, so he convinced Ridge's new girlfriend, Brooke Logan, to hide a letter in which Ridge professed his devotion to Caroline. Thorne and Caroline married soon after, although Caroline was furious when she learned of Thorne's part in hiding the letter.

Caroline had too much to drink at a party, and Ridge thought it would be funny to slip into Caroline's bed. But Caroline, thinking Ridge was Thorne, made love to Ridge. Afterwards, Thorne was frustrated by Caroline's hesitancy to be intimate with him. While recovering from an appendectomy, Thorne overheard Eric and Stephanie discussing Ridge's prank. Drinking heavily while on sleeping pill, Thorne grabbed Stephanie's gun and shot Ridge in the head. Thorne passed out, so Stephanie wiped Thorne's fingerprints from the gun and told the police she had shot Ridge, thinking he was a prowler. Neither Thorne nor Ridge had any memory of what had happened that night.

Thorne's family worked overtime to keep Thorne from remembering what he had done, fearing a repeat episode. Caroline, who wanted Ridge back, took Thorne to a therapist under the guise of getting marriage counseling, and soon Thorne was strong enough to grant Caroline a divorce. When Thorne finally learned of Ridge's prank, Thorne cut both Ridge and Caroline out of his life and turned an eye toward Brooke's sister, Donna Logan.

Thorne had grown up thinking his youngest sister, Angela, was dead, but Stephanie was caring for a comatose Angela on the sly. No one knew that Angela's doctor had replaced Angela, who had died, with an imposter to bilk money out of the Forresters. "Angela" was severely burned escaping with the doctor, and later introduced herself to Thorne as Deveney Dickson. Thorne's empathy and offer of plastic surgery softened "Deveney", who fell in love with Thorne, but "Deveney" still went through with drugging Thorne and giving him a gun to shoot Ridge. Thorne responded when Ridge talked him down, and Angela got away with the money Thorne had given her for the surgery.

Thorne met Macy Alexander when her mother, Sally Spectra, meant to lock Macy and Ridge in a room on the Queen Mary during a fashion show. Thorne briefly dated Macy and Donna Logan at the same time, but ultimately Thorne chose Macy. The Forresters and the Spectras were fashion rivals, and neither family approved of Thorne and Macy's relationship. Thorne and Macy married anyway, but separated when the strain of the families' battle became too much.

During the separation, Macy dated Jake Maclaine, while Thorne got close to Karen Spencer, Caroline's long-lost identical twin sister. Just as Thorne asked Karen to move in with him, Macy asked for a reconciliation, and the three ended up living under the same roof. Macy and Karen got into a food fight over Thorne, who couldn't choose between them. Thorne finally decided on Macy, but misinterpreted Macy's goodbye hug with Jake, prompting Thorne to settle for Karen. Thorne and Macy's attempts at communication were thwarted by Karen and her father, Bill Spencer, Sr., as well as Sly Donovan, who capitalized on Macy's growing drinking problem by getting her drunk to keep her from meeting with Thorne.

Karen left Thorne after she realized that Thorne still loved Macy. Thorne found Macy passed out in an alley, after which they cleared up their misunderstandings and reconciled. Thorne refused to support Eric's marriage to Sheila Carter, so Sheila spiked Macy's orange juice. When Anthony Armando, who was designing for Spectra, took Macy home and put her to bed, Thorne walked in and punched Anthony. Macy explained that Spectra needed Anthony and refused to fire him, so Thorne left Macy again. Brooke interfered with Ridge's marriage to Taylor Hayes by arranging an overseas business trip with Ridge, so Thorne punched Ridge at the airport and travelled to Paris with Brooke instead.

Thorne returned for Taylor's funeral, and re-established a friendship with Macy, though he briefly dated Forrester model Ivana Vanderveld. Thorne and Macy began singing together and were signed by Decadent Records. Ivana was jealous when Thorne and Macy performed together in Rotterdam, Holland. But Macy collapsed after the show and was diagnosed with throat cancer. Thorne gave up singing and proposed to Macy after she recovered from her surgery. Ivana retaliated by sending Macy one nasty fan letter, but the letters kept coming and became increasingly threatening. Thorne fought with Ivana when the police found stationery in her apartment, and soon after, Ivana was murdered with Thorne's letter opener. Thorne was arrested during his wedding to Macy.

Anthony had framed Thorne because he wanted Macy for himself. He had proposed to Ivana, then played the devastated fiancé to gain Macy's sympathy. Thorne found out Anthony had stationery like Ivana's and broke out of prison to protect Macy, who had gone to Mexico to comfort Anthony. Thorne extracted a confession from Anthony, which Macy overheard. Thorne was recaptured, while Macy pretended to believe in Anthony's innocence. Macy tried to goad Anthony into confessing on tape but was discovered, and Sally was shot in the ensuing melée. Thorne and Macy finally remarried after Anthony was apprehended.

Thorne performed Grease on Broadway for four months. Upon his return, Thorne befriended Claudia Cortez. Claudia had come to the U.S. for political asylum but was in the country illegally. Thorne gave Claudia a job at Forrester anyway, and Claudia fell for Thorne. When Macy caught Claudia giving Thorne a massage, Macy reported Claudia to immigration, which drove a wedge between Macy and Thorne. Meanwhile, Thorne began to see the back-from-the-dead Taylor in a new light. After Macy divorced Thorne, Claudia and Thorne almost made love, but Claudia shied away when she realized the depth of Thorne's feelings for Taylor.

Despondent over Ridge, Taylor got drunk and set her nightgown on fire with a lantern. Thorne saved Taylor and stood by her as she recovered from her burns. While Ridge was in jail for shooting Grant Chambers, Thorne convinced Taylor to lie that Ridge's baby was Thorne's and even proposed to Taylor in Hawaii. But soon Taylor wanted to tell Ridge the truth, so Thorne again worked with Brooke to prevent it. Thorne even sedated Taylor with a drugged protein shake when Ridge came to visit. Finally, Thorne relented and agreed to help Taylor stop Ridge and Brooke's wedding, but Taylor went into labor in Thorne's car, forcing Thorne to deliver baby Thomas himself.

Ridge finally found out he was Thomas' father and reunited with Taylor, leaving Thorne in the cold, especially since Macy had just married Grant. Thorne moved in next door to the newlyweds, and Macy was jealous when she saw her best friend, Darla Einstein, making a move on Thorne. Grant was diagnosed with untreatable testicular cancer and wanted Thorne to fulfill Macy's desire to have a family. Thorne shocked Macy by kissing her as Grant lay dying in his hospital bed. After Grant died, Macy would only accept Thorne's friendship. Thorne, who had quit Forrester Creations over Stephanie's preferential treatment of Ridge, stepped in and saved Spectra Fashions from bankruptcy.

When Macy hedged about accepting Thorne's proposal because of the Forrester/Spectra feud, Thorne connected with Brooke. Macy saw Brooke hiding under Thorne's bed and told Stephanie. Thorne arrived at the Big Bear cabin to find Stephanie terrorizing Brooke and saved Brooke from being stabbed by Stephanie . Later, Stephanie had a stroke and didn't remember finding Thorne with Brooke together, so Thorne and Brooke kept their continuing relationship a secret to prevent Stephanie from having another episode. Thorne was conflicted and even dreamt that his relationship with Brooke had killed Stephanie.

Thorne reconciled with an unsuspecting Macy to throw Stephanie off the scent, narrowly avoiding a surprise wedding to Macy that Stephanie had arranged. Eric, Ridge, and Taylor plotted to convince Thorne that Brooke still loved Ridge. While in Venice, Italy, Ridge staged a fight with Taylor and then made a move on Brooke. Thorne was devastated to see Brooke kissing Ridge. Thorne followed Macy to the airport, and married her in Amsterdam. Macy was blissfully unaware that Thorne still thought of Brooke, who was trying to lure Thorne back. Macy overheard Eric and Ridge discussing Thorne's feelings for Brooke and started drinking again.

A sober Macy asked Thorne, who wanted a divorce, to come to Big Bear for a last dance before ending their marriage. After Thorne left, Brooke confronted Macy with divorce papers. Macy tried to drive off, but Brooke jumped in the car with her. Macy drove recklessly to frighten Brooke and collided with a tanker. Thorne arrived and saved Brooke, but before he could get to Macy, the car exploded. At Macy's funeral, Sally exposed Thorne's continuing relationship with Brooke, causing Stephanie to have another stroke. When Stephanie forced Thorne to choose between Brooke and his family, Thorne chose Brooke, and Stephanie disowned him.

Macy's half-sister, Kimberly Fairchild, decided she wanted Thorne, and set about seducing him away from Brooke. Meanwhile, Brooke's children, Rick and Bridget, were against Brooke's relationship with Thorne. Kimberly kissed Thorne backstage at a fashion show, and Bridget raised the curtain so the public would see. Brooke broke things off, and Kimberly took advantage of an inebriated Thorne by lying that they'd had sex. Kimberly also tried to kill Brooke by rigging a heavy photography light to fall on her; Thorne was almost hit when a second light dropped. Thorne and Brooke reconciled and married at the Forrester mansion, even managing to get last-minute support from the family.

Thorne's happiness was short-lived when he overheard Brooke telling Deacon Sharpe that Ridge would always be her soul mate. Thorne had a vision of Macy, and, feeling he had made a terrible mistake with Brooke, Thorne asked Brooke for an annulment. Later, after Taylor was again presumed dead, Thorne shared a few quick kisses with grief counselor Tricia Quick.

Ridge had defected to Spectra and challenged Forrester to a fashion showdown in Portofino, Italy. Thorne chased Lena, a woman that reminded him of Macy. But "Lena" really was Macy: Adam Alexander, Macy's father, had saved Macy before her car exploded. Adam's connections to the mob had made it necessary to take Macy on the run, and Thorne was dismayed when Macy insisted on staying in Italy and marrying her fiancé, Lorenzo Barelli. When Sally had a heart attack, Macy returned to Los Angeles, where Thorne informed Macy they were still married because she had never signed their divorce papers. Macy's marriage to Lorenzo was invalid, leading Thorne and Macy to again reconcile.

Like with Jake years earlier, Thorne mistook Macy's goodbye to Lorenzo. Thorne got drunk and made love to Darla, thinking she was Macy. Thorne and Macy squared things, but now Darla was carrying Thorne's child and wanted an abortion. After Macy had a recurrence of cancer that required her to have a hysterectomy, Thorne asked Darla to let him and Macy raise Darla's child. Darla agreed if Thorne would tell Macy he was its father, after which Macy shunned Darla and asked Thorne for an annulment.

Thorne drew closer to Darla during her pregnancy. On the night Macy headlined a new club, she made peace with Thorne and Darla. Thorne and the horrified clubgoers watched helplessly as a chandelier crashed down on Macy, who went into a coma. Sally was forced to pull the plug on Macy, and Darla named her child Alexandria in tribute to Macy's memory. Darla supported Thorne as he asked to be made president of Forrester Creations, and soon Thorne and Darla were married.

Ridge initially supported Thorne's presidency, but soon challenged Thorne's authority and insulted Darla. Thorne punched Ridge, then attempted a truce. But Darla mistakenly handed Sally photos of the Forrester Ingenue line, which Sally rushed into production. Thorne forgave Darla, but when Ridge banned Darla from the building, the brothers fought and demanded that Eric decide who should leave. Eric chose Ridge, and Thorne raged that he was the only true Forrester son, as it had been revealed that Massimo Marone was really Ridge's father. Thorne threw a chair through a window and told his family they would regret their choice.

Sally made Thorne acting president of Spectra, where Thorne used Forrester's client list to gain support. Thorne also stole Forrester designs to use in a Spectra fashion show. But eventually, Thorne had original Spectra couture created by Spectra mainstay Clarke Garrison, former designer Amber Moore, and Thorne's sister, Felicia. Thorne challenged Forrester to a fashion showdown with Spectra. Thorne lost the competition, but gained Eric's respect. Ridge overheard Eric call Thorne his "only son" and tried to stop Spectra's line from being stocked alongside Forrester in boutiques. Thorne sold his Forrester shares and invested the money in Spectra. But when Spectra lost another fashion showdown featuring Thomas' designs, Thorne lost his investment. Stephanie discovered she was the sole owner of Forrester and offered Thorne his presidency back.

Sally fell ill and lied she was going on a cruise when she was really moving to a retirement home, so Thorne and Darla moved Sally in with them. Thorne also gave Sally a job at Forrester, since Spectra was now owned by Marone Industries.

The night of Alexandria's birthday party, Taylor's daughter, Phoebe Forrester, had a flat tire on a foggy highway, so Darla raced off to help. But Darla fell into the path of an oncoming car and died. Thorne was devastated, and asked for Taylor's psychiatric expertise to help explain things to Alexandria. Thorne and Taylor became close and fell in love. But Taylor had a secret: Taylor had driven drunk while also coming to help Phoebe, and was the one who had hit Darla. Phoebe and Stephanie were afraid Taylor would go to jail, and begged Taylor to keep quiet. However, when Thorne proposed to Taylor, Thorne was horrified to hear that Taylor was responsible for Darla's death.

Thorne felt betrayed by Taylor, Stephanie, and Phoebe for keeping the circumstances of Darla's death from him. Taylor was arrested and pleaded guilty, but, when a witness surfaced who had seen Darla fall into the path of Taylor's car, Thorne encouraged Taylor to change her plea to not guilty, and Taylor was released. Later, Nick Marone took control of Forrester Creations, and Thorne and Ridge pulled together to help Eric create a new company, Forrester Originals.

Meanwhile, Thorne and Taylor moved ahead with their plans to marry, but when Alexandria found out Taylor had killed Darla, Alexandria blacked out Taylor's pictures with crayon and slashed Taylor's wedding dress. Thorne and Taylor called off their engagement, realizing Alexandria wasn't ready to see them married. Thorne became despondent and again turned to alcohol in his grief over Darla. Thorne reconnected with Donna, seeing Darla's face as they made love. Thorne soon asked Donna to marry him, unaware that Donna was only using Thorne to get back at Stephanie for constantly hurting Brooke. On Thorne's wedding day, Donna's other sister, Katie, overheard Donna admitting she didn't love Thorne. When Katie told Thorne what she'd heard, Thorne cancelled the ceremony.

Thorne was unhappy when Donna moved on to Eric, and briefly found himself bonding with Katie, although a romance never developed. When Eric planned to announce his relationship with Donna at a fashion show, Thorne and Felicia locked Donna in the Forrester steam room to keep her from taking the stage. Thorne and his family fought Eric on his decision to give Donna a position in the company. Later, when Eric fell into a coma, Donna temporarily fired Thorne and his siblings. Thorne knew that Donna was spending time with Owen Knight, so when Eric recovered, Thorne hired Donna and Owen lookalikes to kiss for a hidden camera so Eric would divorce Donna. Thorne's scheme failed.

Thorne was suspected of giving Forrester designs to Jackie M after he made noise about Rick and Ridge getting too much attention at Forrester, but the real culprit was Rick. Thorne expected to take the president position when Rick stepped down, but felt even more underappreciated when Brooke made Rick president instead. Thorne and Felicia, feeling Forrester was overrun with Logans, resigned from Forrester when Brooke, Donna, and Katie became models for the Royalty line.

Thorne eventually returned, but soon Bill Spencer, Jr. took control of Forrester and installed his new wife, Katie, as CEO. Katie offered Thorne the vice presidency, but Thorne refused, and Donna was given the position. Thorne joined his family in creating the ugly Dare line in an unsuccessful attempt to sabotage Bill. Thorne was upset when Steffy Forrester got the company back from Bill, but divided the stock between Ridge, Eric, Stephanie, and Taylor, while Thorne got none.

Liam Cooper came to town looking for his long-lost father. It turned out both Thorne and Bill had dated Kelly Cooper, Liam's late mother. Thorne submitted to a DNA test, which showed that Bill was Liam's father. Later, when Thomas developed a crush on Brooke, Thorne pointed out that Thomas didn't have much experience with women and wondered if Thomas was gay. Ridge returned to Taylor when he thought Brooke had slept with Thomas, but, at the wedding, Stephanie admitted she'd gotten Thomas to lie in exchange for her 25% stock. Thorne growled to Eric, saying he was all right being banished in the basement with no stock because he "didn't want to have to spend that much time around you people".

Thorne came to Taylor, who had also been hurt by Thomas' lie, and pointed out that Taylor and her children now controlled 55% of Forrester since Stephanie had made Taylor the trustee of Thomas' stock. When Thorne and Taylor realized they could take over the company, they kissed, reigniting their romance. Thorne made a power play at Forrester, but lost Taylor's support when she realized a takeover would put her children against their father. Thorne and Taylor later made up, with their continuing romance happening primarily off-screen, which has ended due to Taylor's relationship with Eric Forrester.

Most recently, Thorne and Thomas strongly disagreed with Eric's decision to make Rick president of Forrester Creations. Thorne's daughter Alexandria Forrester has returned and is working at Forrester Creations with Hope Logan. On January 6, 2014, Ridge and Aly revealed to Rick that Thorne has taken over Ridge's former position as head of Forrester International.

Thorne has returned several times a year as follows; after the helicopter crash of his brother Ridge, and late with Taylor, revealing to his relatives that he had started a new relationship with her. This caused Aly much anger and anxiety, but was resolved with conversations with Oliver and Thorne. Aly eventually found it okay because it makes Thorne happy until May 2015 when she announced to Oliver Jones that she was still quite angry at her.

Thorne appeared for a few episodes in and around the death of his daughter Aly in July 2015 and then in September 2016 in an attempt to stop Eric and Quinn's wedding. In 2018, Katie Logan begins dating Thorne, her sister Brooke's ex-husband and brother of her own former fiancé, Ridge. Thorne convinces Katie to go after full custody of her son with Bill, given that Bill had neglected to spend time with little Will as of late. To secure Katie's chances, Thorne and Katie get married. Full custody is awarded to Katie, but acrimony between the Forrester brothers and Bill ensues. A fight breaks out between Bill, Ridge, and Thorne; Bill ended up falling over his house's balcony and was then in a coma.

References 

The Bold and the Beautiful characters
Television characters introduced in 1987
Male characters in television
Forrester family